Gerley is a name. It may refer to:

 Victor Gerley (fl. 1965–1968), American soccer goalkeeper
 Gerley (footballer) (born 1990), Gerley Ferreira de Souza, Brazilian football left-back